The Search for Spock is a 1984 board game published by FASA.

Gameplay
The Search for Spock is a game in which each player takes a Federation or Klingon character and lands on the Genesis Planet to recover young Spock before the planet can disintegrate into random atoms.

Reception
Steve Crow reviewed The Search for Spock in Space Gamer No. 71. Crow commented that "The only reason you might wish to buy this is if you have some extra money to spend and are looking for a solitaire game. Vague rules make the game extremely difficult to play in spots and the frustration level is high. If you wish to buy The Search for Spock, be prepared to do some tinkering to make it challenging, yet survivable."

References

Board games introduced in 1984
FASA games